Anti-runway penetration bombs are systems involving bombs or bomblets designed to disrupt the surface of an airfield runway and make it unusable for flight operations.

Perhaps the most strategically decisive, best known, and first wartime use of specialized cratering anti-runway weapons was by Israel during the 1967 Six-Day War. The dibber bombs played a major part in the near complete destruction of the large Egyptian Air Force, mostly on the ground, in a preemptive strike on the first morning of the war by the commitment of the whole of the far smaller Israeli Air Force to the strike. The surprising elimination of the Egyptian air force and resulting Israeli air supremacy contributed significantly to the outcome of the war on all fronts. The IMI 'Runway Piercing Bomb' was a prototype Israeli-French anti-runway weapon. It used rocket braking over the target and a second rocket burst to plunge through the runway surface and explode.

One system available from 1977 diverging from the French/Israeli runway piercing bomb concept used in 1967 is the Matra Durandal, a single 450 lb bomb with parachute braking, rocket booster, and two warheads. Dropped by aircraft flying at low level, it is braked by parachute, and when at the correct angle fires a rocket to impact the runway. It first ignites a large explosive charge to create a crater, and then uses a smaller charge that has penetrated the crater to displace adjacent concrete slabs. The slabs, once displaced, are far harder to deal with than a simple hole that can be patched with asphalt. The Durandal has been widely exported. The Durandal was used in 1991 by the United States Air Force in the initial stages of the Gulf War, delivered by General Dynamics F-111 Aardvarks against Iraqi airfields.

Another, now withdrawn from service, was the JP233, a dispenser and submunitions system. An aircraft would fly over the target runway and release a mixture of penetrating and anti-personnel submunitions to both crater the runway and impede repair work. The anti-personnel mines could be armed with time-delay fuses, threatening runway repair crews with the risk of death or bodily injury. After the UK signed an international accord banning cluster mines, the JP233 was retired.

See also
Cluster bomb
DRDO Smart Anti-Airfield Weapon
Fares Scale of Injuries due to Cluster Munitions

References

Aerial bombs